Sir Winston Churchill Secondary School is a Canadian secondary school located in St. Catharines, Ontario.  It is one of eight public secondary schools in the city, and is situated in the community of Glenridge. The secondary school is known for their competitive sports, extremely strong academics, arts, their bulldog mascot and extensive list of extracurriculars.  It is administered by the District School Board of Niagara.

History
Sir Winston was founded in 1959. It was named after the British Prime Minister, who led the United Kingdom through the Second World War.

Extended French program
Sir Winston Churchill's Extended French program has been in existence for over 30 years. The school offers the program through grades 9 to 12 to students who participated in Extended French previously in elementary school. Twelve of the forty credits that an Extended French student completes will be taught in French. These are mainly core subjects like French, Math, Science and Social Sciences.

Sports
Sir Winston Churchill offers several extracurricular sports activities to its students, including football, swimming, cross country running, track and field, volleyball, basketball, soccer, lacrosse, hockey, rowing, and others.

Notable alumni
 Malin Akerman, actress and model
 Jeffrey Finley, CFL defensive lineman for the Montreal Alouettes
 Tammy Homolka (grade 10 student at death, December 24, 1990), murder victim of Karla Homolka and Paul Bernardo
 Paul Jenkins, economist, former Senior Deputy Governor and former Chief Operating Officer of the Bank of Canada
 Keith Makubuya, professional soccer player
 Imane Anys, YouTuber
 Lauren Riihimaki, YouTuber

See also
 District School Board of Niagara
 Education in Ontario
 Extended French program
 List of secondary schools in Ontario

References

External links
 District School Board of Niagara
 Ontario Ministry of Education
 Sir Winston Churchill Secondary School

High schools in the Regional Municipality of Niagara
Educational institutions established in 1959
Buildings and structures in St. Catharines
Education in St. Catharines
1959 establishments in Ontario